The Shadows' Madame was the debut album for Cadaveria.

Track listing
All lyrics and music by Cadaveria, unless otherwise noted.

Note: Parts of the lyric for "Circle of Eternal Becoming" were taken directly from Yeats' "Ideas of Good and Evil"; hence the lyrical co-credit.  Baudelaire receives a co-credit on "Spell" as the band used parts of "Les Fleurs du Mal".  The third and last outside credit comes from Giuseppe Verdi; "Spell" incorporates the music from act II/scene XV of Verdi's "La Traviata".

Personnel
Cadaveria: Vocals
Frank Booth: Guitars
Baron Markonen: Keyboards
Killer Bob: Bass
Marcelo Santos (aka Flegias): Drums

Production
Arranged and Produced by Cadaveria
Recorded and mixed by John DNA
Mastered by Alberto Cutolo at Massive Arts Studios
All songs copyright BL Music

References

Cadaveria albums
2002 debut albums
Scarlet Records albums